Ignacio González Espinoza (born 8 September 1991) is a Mexican footballer who currently plays for Correcaminos UAT.

Career
González played for Monarcas Morelia affiliate Toros Neza from 2011 to 2012 before being loaned to UNAM in November 2012, after an unsuccessful stint he returned to Morelia for the Clausura 2014.

Honours
Supercopa MX: 2014

References

External links
 
 
 

1991 births
Living people
Liga MX players
Ascenso MX players
Toros Neza footballers
Club Universidad Nacional footballers
Atlético Morelia players
Dorados de Sinaloa footballers
Correcaminos UAT footballers
Footballers from Jalisco
Association football defenders
Mexican footballers